Cheryl Dawn Foggo  is a Canadian author, documentary film director, screenwriter and playwright.

Biography
Born in Calgary, Alberta in 1956, she is descended from Black Oklahomans who settled in Maidstone, Saskatchewan in 1910. She also had ancestors who lived in Amber Valley, Alberta and Campsie, Alberta. Foggo knew CTrain designer Oliver Bowen when she was growing up in Calgary and her mother's bridesmaid and close friend was Violet King Henry, the first Black woman lawyer in Canada.

Advocacy
A keen researcher and voice for Black pioneers in Western Canada, Foggo recently served on the advisory board for Black on the Prairies, a multi-platform archive and resource initiated and curated by journalist Omayra Issa and CBC Radio host Ify Chiwetelu on CBC  and has also had multiple presentations of her multi-media creations: Ranchers, Rebels and the Righteous, Creole, Travelling On, Five Voices and Unlocking Sacred Codes. She began work on the play John Ware Re-Imagined, hoping to bring attention to the Black Albertan cowboy and rancher John Ware in time for the centennial of the Calgary Stampede in 2012.

She has been profiled in Who's Who in Black Canada.

She volunteers on multiple boards as an advocate for writers and Black artists and is an active mentor and lecturer.

Journalism
Foggo has written for Theatre Alberta, Reader's Digest.ca, Avenue, AlbertaViews, Alberta Ventures, Calgary, Canadian, Western Living, Sunday Magazine, Arts Bridge, Muse, Canadian Consumer, the Calgary Herald, The Globe and Mail and Legacy.

Her work has been anthologized in multiple collections, including The Black Prairie Archives: An Anthology edited by Karina Vernon, Calgary Through The Eyes of Writers edited by Shaun Hunter, Alberta Encore, One Step Over The Line, Directions-The Bicentenary of the Abolition of the British Slave Trade, Remembering Chinook Country and Unsettled Pasts.

Plays
Her short play The Sender was commissioned as part of Obsidian Theatre Company's 21 Black Futures, now streaming on CBC Television Gem.

Her play Heaven is scheduled for production at the Citadel Theatre in summer 2021.

In August 2014, her play John Ware Reimagined premiered in Calgary, produced by Ellipsis Tree Collective Theatre Company. John Ware Reimagined had its second production at  Workshop West Theatre Company in 2017. An early version of the play had its first public reading in 2012.
The script won the Writers' Guild of Alberta 2015 Gwen Pharis Ringwood Award for Drama.

In August 2012, The Devil We Know, her play co-written with Clem Martini, premiered at the Blyth Festival.

In 2010, she created a stage adaptation of Chinua Achebe's Things Fall Apart, receiving workshops and staged readings during Theatre Calgary's Fuse Festival and Afrikadey.

Heaven was first produced by  Lunchbox Theatre Company in 2001 and aired on CBC Radio Sunday Showcase and Monday Night Playhouse in 2004.

Her play Turnaround, co-written with Clem Martini, was produced by Lunchbox Theatre and Quest Theatre Company in 1999.

Books
Her first book Pourin’ Down Rain: A Black Woman Claims Her Place in the Canadian West is a memoir about five generations of her family and talks about growing up Black on the Canadian prairies. It was a finalist for the Alberta Culture Non-fiction Award in 1990. In 2020,  Brush Education released the 30th anniversary edition. The audio version of the 30th anniversary edition is read by acclaimed actor Karen Robinson.

Her three children's/YA books - One Thing That's True (1998), I Have Been in Danger (2001), Dear Baobab, (2011) - offer positive representations of Black and mixed-race childhoods.

Filmmaking
Foggo made John Ware Reclaimed, a documentary film about legendary Black cowboy John Ware with the National Film Board of Canada (NFB).John Ware Reclaimed had its world premiere at the Calgary International Film Festival in 2020, where it received the CTV Alberta Feature Audience Choice Award.

In 2019 she wrote and directed the short film Kicking Up A Fuss: The Charles Daniels Story, which was a finalist for an AMPIA in 2020.

In 2002, she wrote and directed the NFB documentary film The Journey of Lesra Martin.

She has been a consultant on several other films and was a member of the story team on the CBC drama North of 60 for 2.5 seasons.

Filmography

Screenwriting
 Carol's Mirror (1992), winner of national and international educational film awards
 member, story-writing team, North of Sixty TV series, for 2.5 seasons
 The Higher Law, co-written for North of Sixty TV series
 Love Hurts (1998), episode of North of Sixty TV series, finalist for Alberta Motion Picture Industry Awards
 consultant, NFB's Race is a Four Letter Word (2006)
 researcher, National Film Board's (NFB), Mighty Jerome (2010)

Awards
 2021 Grand Prize Regards d'ici category Vues d'Afrique Festival Internationale for John Ware Reclaimed
2021 Calgary Black Chambers Arts, Entertainment and Media Award
2020 Calgary International Film Festival CTV Alberta Feature Audience Choice Award for John Ware Reclaimed.
 2015 Writers Guild of Alberta Gwen Pharis Ringwood Award for Drama for John Ware Reimagined.
2015 Obsidian Black Achievement Award for Professional Excellence.
2014 Writers Guild of Canada Sondra Kelly Screenplay Award
2008 national Harry Jerome Award For The Arts
 Merit Award, Fort Calgary (2004) 
 Chris Award for Journey of Lesra Martin, Columbus International Film Festival (2003) 
 Best Education Program, Gold Apple Award & Short Drama Award, for Carol's Mirror (1992) 
 Great North TV Writing Competition (1995) 
 Achievement Award, BAASA (1998)

Award nominations
 Writers Guild of Canada documentary script
Governor General 
 Silver Birch 
 Blue Heron 
 Mr. Christie 
 The Writers Guild of Alberta R. Ross Annett 
 finalist in Theatre BC's National Playwriting Competition 
 Love Hurts, finalist, Alberta Motion Picture Industry Awards
Kicking Up a Fuss: The Charles Daniels Story, finalist, Alberta Motion Picture Industry Awards

References

External links
 
 Biography (Alberta Order of Excellence)

21st-century Canadian novelists
20th-century Canadian dramatists and playwrights
21st-century Canadian dramatists and playwrights
20th-century Canadian women writers
21st-century Canadian women writers
Canadian women dramatists and playwrights
Canadian women journalists
Canadian women novelists
People from Amber Valley, Alberta
Writers from Calgary
Canadian people of African-American descent
Black Canadian writers
Living people
Canadian women film directors
Black Canadian filmmakers
Canadian documentary film directors
Film directors from Calgary
Canadian women non-fiction writers
1956 births
Canadian women documentary filmmakers